Since the year 1528 CE, and under the Regency of Algiers, the Constantine Province (or Constantine beylik) in Algeria was governed by a Bey appointed by the dey of Algiers, until Constantine was taken by the French Royal Army on 13 October 1837. As for the other provinces of the Regency (the beylik of Oran and the beylik of the Titteri), the bey of Constantine was the representative of the dey of Algiers and administrated the provinces in his name.

From 1528 to 1830, the province of Constantine was governed by 44 beys, the first of whom was Ramdane-Tchulak bey who reigned on the province between 1528 and 1567. The last was Ahmed Bey whose reign started in 1826. This is the list of the beys and the year their mandate begun, annotated with important facts:

Chronological List 

 Ramdane-Tchulak bey, 1528
 Djaâfer bey, 1567
 Mourad bey, 1637-was remembered for the revolt of Ahmed Sakheri
 Ferhat bey, 1648
 Mohammed bey ben Ferbat, 1652
 Redjem bey, 1667
 Kheïr ed-din bey, 1673
 Abdul-Rahman Dali bey, 1676
 Omar ben Abd-el Ramdan, 1679
 Châban bey, 1687
 Ali Khoudja bey, 1692
 Ahmed bey ben Ferhat, 1700
 Brahim bey, 1702
 Hamouda bey, 1709
 Ali bey ben Hamouda, 1708
 Hussein chaouch, 1709
 Abd-el Rahman bey, 1710
 Hosseïn Denguezli Bey, 1710
 Ali bey ben Salah, 1710
 Kelian Hussein bou Komia, 1713
 Hussein bey bou Hanak, 1746
 Hosseïn Bey (called "Zereg-Aïnou" meaning "the blue eyed"), 1753
 Ahmed Bey El-Kolli, 1756, died of illness
 Salah Bey, 1771–1792, born in 1725 in Izmir in Turkey. Hassan Pasha, the dey of Algiers, ordered his assassination in 1792.
 Hussein Bey ben Bousnek, 1 September 1791, son of Hassan Pasha Bousnek, assassinated.
 El Asrak Aïno, 1791
 Moustapha ben Sliman El-Ouznadji, February 1795 – January 1798, assassinated.
 Hadj-Mustapha-Ingliz (called "the British"), January 1798 – 1803 exiled to Tunis
 Osman Ben Koulougli, 1803, Killed facing Kabyles rebels
 Abdallah Bey, 1804, Assassinated.
 Hussein bey ben Salah, 1806, son of Salah bey the Turk. Assassinated as was his father.
 Ali bey ben Youssef, August 1807. Assassinated.
 Bey-Rouhou, ruled a fortnight. Assassinated.
 Ahmed bey Tobbal, 1808–1811. Assassinated.
 Mohammed Nàman bey, 1811–1814. Assassinated.
 Mohammed Chakar bey, 1814–1818. Assassinated.

 Kara Mustapha, 1818–1818, 33 days of reign. Assassinated.
 Ahmed Bey El Mamelouk, 1818–1818, reigned for a month; he was named bey once again later.
 Braham bey Charbi, 1 year of reign. Assassinated.
 Mohammed bey Mili, 1818–1819, surnamed bou chetabia (the Machete man). 2 years of reign. Exiled to Algiers.
 Ahmed bey El Mamelouk, 1820–1822. Exiled to Miliana, where he was assassinated.
 Ibrahim Bey, 1822–1824, Exiled to Médéa, Assassinated in 1832 on the orders of Ahmed Bey.
 Mohammed bey Malamli, 1824–1826, or Manamani. Ruled two years. Exiled to Algiers.
 Ahmed Bey, 1826-15 December 1837. Declared dethroned by the French Empire the December 15th, 1830, for non-submission.

See also 

 List of Pashas and Deys of Algiers
Algeria
Heads of state of Algeria
Heads of government of Algeria
Colonial heads of Algeria
Lists of office-holders

Notes and references 

Algeria history-related lists
Lists of office-holders in Algeria
Constantine Province
People from Constantine, Algeria
Qusantina